The US Army Combat Lifesaver Course is an official medical training course conducted by the US Army. The course is intended to provide an intermediate step between the buddy aid-style basic life support taught to every soldier and the advanced life support skills that are taught to US Army Combat Medics and to US Army Special Forces Medical Sergeants  ( MOS 68W and MOS 18D respectively).

Course outline
 40 hours theory & practical instruction 
 50 question written exam (pass/fail), 70% minimum score
 20 minute practical exam (pass/fail), 100% minimum score

While a CLS certification is technically permanent, soldiers in Priority 1 units (actively-deploying brigade combat teams, for example) must retake the course once a year to retain their certification.

Scope of curriculum
Aside from basic first aid, Combat Lifesavers are also taught to identify and perform the correct pre-hospital treatment for:
 Tension pneumothorax produced by a penetrating (bullet/frag) or non-penetrating (explosive barotrauma) lung injury
 Vascular hypovolemia produced by uncontrolled external hemorrhage
 External arterial hemorrhage (especially from an extremity)
 Destabilized spinal cord injuries
 Sucking chest wound produced by a penetrating (bullet/frag) chest injury
 Respiratory failure produced by a non patent airway in an unconscious or semi-conscious casualty

Combat Lifesavers are not, however, trained or permitted to perform (among other things) laryngoscopy, single lumen tracheal intubation or any kind of surgery (such as emergency cricothyrotomy)

References

Military education and training in the United States